Steven Alfonso Del Duca (born July 7, 1973) is a Canadian politician who has been serving as the 5th mayor of Vaughan since 2022. Del Duca previously served as the leader of the Ontario Liberal Party from 2020 to 2022 and was an Ontario cabinet minister from 2014 to 2018, first as the minister of transportation and then as the minister of economic development. He represented the riding of Vaughan in the Ontario Legislative Assembly from 2012 to 2018. On October 24, 2022, he was elected the mayor of Vaughan, taking office on November 15.

Early and personal life 
Steven Alfonso Del Duca was born on July 7, 1973 in Etobicoke, Ontario. He is a first-generation Canadian, born to an Italian father and a Scottish mother. His paternal grandfather immigrated to Canada from Italy in 1951.

Del Duca has cited his grandparents as key influences on his political career, stating, “Ontario and Canada gave them a ton of opportunity. I grew up believing… you have to be dedicated, sacrifice, all those important things. But the other half of the bargain is that this province, this country are supposed to give you real opportunity.”

He lives with his wife, Utilia Amaral, and their two daughters, in Woodbridge, Ontario. Del Duca's younger brother, Michael, was killed in a car crash in June 2018.

Education and early career 
Del Duca studied political science and Canadian history at the University of Toronto and Carleton University before earning a law degree from Osgoode Hall Law School. He was not called to the bar in Ontario and has not practiced law.

Del Duca founded a local group called Go Vote Vaughan in 2006 in an effort to boost voter turnout in his hometown’s municipal elections and worked on a city task force for democratic reform at a time when Vaughan’s local government had a reputation for dysfunction.

In 2008, Del Duca served as the fundraising chair for the Annual Vaughan Hospital Fundraising Gala that raised over $1 million. He worked with all levels of government, community leaders and organizations to establish the Greater Toronto Region Economic Summit, which took place in May 2009.

Del Duca has worked as an executive assistant to MPP Greg Sorbara and was the director of public affairs for the Carpenters’ District Council of Ontario before he was elected in 2012.

Political career

Member of Provincial Parliament and cabinet minister 
In 2012, he ran as the Liberal candidate in the riding of Vaughan, in a by-election called to replace Greg Sorbara who retired earlier in the year. He defeated the Progressive Conservative (PC) candidate Tony Genco. He was re-elected in the 2014 provincial election defeating PC candidate Peter Meffe.

On June 24, 2014, he was named to cabinet by Premier Kathleen Wynne as the minister of transportation. In 2014, as the Minister of Transportation, he allocated $29 billion dedicated to transit and transportation in the GTA over 10 years.

In June 2016, the Ministry of Transportation issued a press release about twelve new stations for the GO Transit network, only ten of which had been approved by the Metrolinx board planning the regional transit projects. The board convened in late June to approve the two additional stations, Kirby GO Station for the Barrie line, and Lawrence East station as part of the SmartTrack project. Metrolinx reports stated that the Kirby station would have a negative effect on overall ridership on the line.

Del Duca defended the decision stating that Metrolinx’s original analysis didn’t take into account the explosive population growth planned in Vaughan and Etobicoke, and the transit needs that would accompany this growth. He also noted that a similar economic assessment done by Toronto staff gave the Toronto Relief Line a negative score despite an expert consensus that the project was needed to meet Toronto’s long-term transit needs.

In January 2018, Del Duca left his position as minister of transportation and took over the Ministry of Economic Development and Growth.

During the June 2018 election, Del Duca ran for the Ontario Liberal Party in the provincial election for Vaughan–Woodbridge, and lost to PC Candidate Michael Tibollo. Del Duca was amongst a wave of Ontario Liberal Party MPPs who lost their seat during that election, removing the Liberal Party from government and relegating them to the third party in Ontario's legislature. After losing his seat, Del Duca taught a course at York University from January to April 2019.

Weeks after losing his provincial seat, it was reported that Del Duca would be running to be regional chair of York Region in the October 22, 2018, municipal election, but owing to the provincial government's passing of the Better Local Government Act, there was no election for the post.

Ontario Liberal leader 
On April 3, 2019, Del Duca announced that he would enter the 2020 Ontario Liberal Party leadership election. On March 7, 2020, he won the election with 58.8 per cent of the ballot vote, having received 1,258 delegate votes. Under his leadership, the Ontario Liberals have retired their $10 million debt from the 2018 election and nominated an equal slate of male and female candidates across the province.

He has focused his time on publicly-funded education,  health care, a clean, safe and health environment, and economic dignity. Key commitments include a plan to end for-profit long-term care and adopt a “home-care first” approach to seniors’ care, a portable benefits package for Ontario workers, and a ban on handguns across the province. Del Duca has also announced that the Ontario Liberal Party will work to provide equal pay and opportunity for women, create five new provincial parks, fight systemic racism in schools and policing, and boost Old Age Security payments.

2022 Ontario general election 
Del Duca ran in the riding of Vaughan—Woodbridge in the 2022 Ontario general election. After failing to win the seat, Del Duca announced his pending resignation as party leader. His resignation took effect on August 3 with the appointment of John Fraser to serve as the interim leader.

Mayor of Vaughan 
In August 2022, Del Duca announced he would run for mayor of Vaughan.

On October 24, 2022, he was narrowly elected the 5th mayor of Vaughan. He took office on November 15.

Del Duca served as mayor of Vaughan during the 2022 Vaughan shooting, where six people (including the gunman) were killed and one was injured. Del Duca also attended the candlelight vigil held for the victims of the shooting.

Electoral record 
2022 Vaughan mayoral election

Notes

References

External links 
 

21st-century Canadian politicians
Living people
Canadian people of Italian descent
Canadian people of Scottish descent
Members of the Executive Council of Ontario
Ontario Liberal Party MPPs
Osgoode Hall Law School alumni
Mayors of Vaughan
Leaders of the Ontario Liberal Party
1973 births